KCJM-LP (107.9 FM) was a radio station licensed to Alexandria, Louisiana, United States. The station was owned by M&M Community Development Inc., Alexandria Branch.

The station was taken off the air in 2015, but the Federal Communications Commission was not made aware until June 2020, when a technical consultant informed it that the station's studio facilities had been emptied years prior. As a result, the station's license was deemed to have expired, and was cancelled on August 21, 2020.

References

External links
 

Radio stations in Louisiana
Low-power FM radio stations in Louisiana
Mass media in Alexandria, Louisiana
Radio stations established in 2001
2001 establishments in Louisiana
Radio stations disestablished in 2020
2020 disestablishments in Louisiana
Defunct radio stations in the United States
Defunct mass media in Louisiana